Esther Lanser (born 6 January 1984) is a former Dutch international cricketer who played for the Dutch national side between 2010 and 2011. She was born and raised in New Zealand, and continued to play for Central Districts, a New Zealand domestic team, throughout her time with the Netherlands.

Lanser was born in Masterton, in New Zealand's Wellington Region, and attended Wairarapa College. She made her debut for Central Districts in New Zealand's State League during the 2008–09 season, and quickly established herself in the side. In 2010, Lanser was invited to play for the Netherlands in the Women's County Championship, qualifying for the team by virtue of being a Dutch passport holder. She was subsequently named in the Dutch squad for the 2010 European Championship, making her One Day International (ODI) debut against Ireland.

Later in the year, Lanser played in the 2010 ICC Women's Challenge in South Africa, where she made her Twenty20 International debut. In the team's loss to Pakistan in the ODI section of the tournament, she was named man of the match, after taking 2/22 from 10 overs and scoring 75 runs opening the batting. Lanser's second and final major international tournament for the Netherlands was the 2011 World Cup Qualifier in Bangladesh, where she played four matches.

References

1984 births
Dutch women cricketers
Living people
Netherlands women One Day International cricketers
Netherlands women Twenty20 International cricketers
New Zealand people of Dutch descent
New Zealand women cricketers
Cricketers from Masterton